The  Poweshiek County Courthouse  in Montezuma, Iowa, United States, was built in 1859. It was individually listed on the National Register of Historic Places in 1981 as a part of the County Courthouses in Iowa Thematic Resource. In 2012 it was listed as a contributing property in the Montezuma Downtown Historic District. The courthouse is the second building the county has used for court functions and county administration.

History
Poweshiek County's first courthouse was a two-story frame building constructed on the northeast corner of the town square in 1850. It served the community as a school, church, and meeting place as well as a courthouse. The courtroom was on the first floor and the county offices were located on the second floor. In time the building was remodeled as a house.

The present building was built for $1,928.15 in 1856. Drake & Dryden designed and built the Greek Revival structure, which is one of the oldest courthouses and one of few that are left in this architectural style in Iowa.  An addition was made to the building in 1890 and major repair work was completed in 1933. Another addition on the south side of the building was completed in 1982.

Architecture
The courthouse is a two-story structure composed of dark red brick. A large square brick tower on the main facade rises to a white octagonal bell tower with a white dome. The arched main entrance is located at the base of the tower. The building also features pedimented gable ends, a wide triglyph frieze, and pilasters whose caps crowd the tops of the second-story windows. The raised basement is composed of coarse stone. The significance of the courthouse is derived from its association with county government, and the political power and prestige of Montezuma as the county seat.

References

Government buildings completed in 1859
Greek Revival architecture in Iowa
Buildings and structures in Poweshiek County, Iowa
Courthouses on the National Register of Historic Places in Iowa
County courthouses in Iowa
National Register of Historic Places in Poweshiek County, Iowa
Individually listed contributing properties to historic districts on the National Register in Iowa